Interstate 90 (I-90) runs east–west through the western, central and southern portions of the U.S. state of Wisconsin. About  of I-90 lie in the state.

All 187 miles of I-90 in Wisconsin have a speed limit of 70 mph.

Route description

The highway enters from Minnesota over the Mississippi River just northwest of La Crosse. The freeway passes north of La Crosse and south of Onalaska as it heads towards Tomah. Once there, it joins I-94. The two Interstates run concurrently for the next  to Madison. I-39 continues along I-90 for the remaining  in Wisconsin.

I-94 breaks away eastward toward Milwaukee at what is commonly known as the Badger Interchange, where the three Interstates meet with WIS 30.  The remaining routes continue south to Janesville and Beloit before exiting the state. 

Along I-90 in Wisconsin, there are 8 rest stops, in cities like La Crosse, Portage, Beloit, Janesville, Sparta, and more.

History
In 1959, I-90 was extended north from Rockton Road, the Northwest Tollway's (now Jane Addams Memorial Tollway's) northern terminus, in Illinois to US 14 near Janesville, Wisconsin. In 1961, another section of I-90 was opened. This section ran from US 12/US 18 (later moved slightly southward) near Madison to US 12/US 16 (now US 12/WIS 16) near Wisconsin Dells. In 1962, a connection between both opened sections opened to traffic. In 1964, I-90 was extended northwestward to US 12/US 16 (now US 12/WIS 16) near Tomah.

The Dresbach Bridge, spanning the Mississippi River west of La Crosse, was dedicated and opened to traffic on October 12, 1967. By 1969, another separate section of I-90 was opened, traveling from the Minnesota state line to US 16 (now WIS 16) near La Crosse. Later, both opened sections were then connected together.

The Dresbach Bridge was replaced by the states of Minnesota and Wisconsin in 2016 under the former's program to replace outdated bridge designs following the 2007 I-35W bridge collapse. The old bridge was closed in April 2016 and the new structure opened in October.

This involved widening the corridor to six lanes (eight lanes in the Janesville area) and reconfiguring all interchanges, including the I-43/WIS 81 interchange. The overall project is scheduled to be completed in 2021.

Exit list

References

External links

 I-90 at Wisconsin Highways

 Wisconsin
90
Transportation in La Crosse County, Wisconsin
Transportation in Monroe County, Wisconsin
Transportation in Juneau County, Wisconsin
Transportation in Sauk County, Wisconsin
Transportation in Columbia County, Wisconsin
Transportation in Dane County, Wisconsin
Transportation in Rock County, Wisconsin